Magastara was a town of ancient Pisidia inhabited during Roman times. Its name does not occur in ancient authors, but is inferred from epigraphic and other evidence.

Its site is tentatively located near Lengüme, in Asiatic Turkey.

References

Populated places in Pisidia
Former populated places in Turkey
Roman towns and cities in Turkey
History of Burdur Province